Marian Fuks (28 September 1914 – 23 October 2022) was a Polish historian specializing in the history of Polish Jews in Warsaw. He was director of the Jewish Historical Institute in the years 1968–1969 and 1971–1973 and one of the oldest men in Poland. Fuks died on 23 October 2022, at the age of 108.

References

External links
 A MEETING WITH PROF. MARIAN FUKS AND WITH JOSEPH MALOVANY

1914 births
2022 deaths
20th-century Polish Jews
20th-century Polish historians
Polish male non-fiction writers
University of Warsaw alumni
Polish centenarians
Men centenarians